"Trois Villes saintes" is an essay written  by French Nobel laureate J. M. G. Le Clézio.

Written in French
The title could be translated into English as "Three sacred townships"

Subject
Men, three cities, Chancah, Tixcacal, Chun Pom, and the drought that attacks the freedom stifled by the silence of the gods who could speak and were silent. Employed by the Institute of Latin America in 1967, JMG Le is Clézio took deep passion for this region and for the Indians. This experience greatly impressed his work and changed his world view.  For four years, from 1970 to 1974, he shared the lives of the Emberá speaking peoples  in the heart of the Panamanian jungle.

Publication history

Magazine

1

fin

First French edition

References

1980 essays
Essays by J. M. G. Le Clézio
Works by J. M. G. Le Clézio